Newbury is a town in Essex County, Massachusetts, USA. The population was 6,716 at the 2020 census. Newbury includes the villages of Old Town (Newbury Center), Plum Island and Byfield.  Each village is a precinct with its own voting district, various town offices, and business center.

History 
Native Americans lived along the Merrimack River for thousands of years prior to European colonization of the Americas. At the time of contact, Pennacook or Pentucket controlled territory north of the Merrimack, while Agawam and Naumkeag controlled territory southeast and southwest of the river respectively. The original name for the land that would become Newbury may have been Quascancunquen meaning "waterfall," referring to the falls in Byfield where Central Street crosses the Parker River, and was likely part of the territory of Agawam sachem Masconomet at the time of contact. No formal agreements between the original inhabitants of Newbury and English colonists would be made until more than a generation had passed from settlement and the effects of virgin soil epidemics had significantly decreased native populations in the area.

English colonists settled and incorporated Newbury Plantation in 1635. The Rev. Thomas Parker and cousin Rev. James Noyes, along with the latter's brother Nicholas, led a group of about 100 pioneers from Wiltshire, England. They sailed from the River Thames aboard the ship Mary and John, first landing in Agawam (now Ipswich) in 1634. They arrived the next spring at the Quascacunquen River, now the Parker River. A commemorative stone marks the spot where Nicholas Noyes was the first of the new settlers to leap ashore at Newbury, named after the town in Berkshire, England.

In 1650, 30 acres of modern day West Newbury referred to as Indian Hill was purchased by the town of Newbury from an indigenous man named Great Tom for three pounds. In 1681, the descendants of an indigenous man Old Will would sell one hundred and sixty acres to the town of Newbury for six pounds, thirteen shillings, and four pence. Finally, in 1700, the grandson of sachem Masconomet of the Agawam would relinquish his title to any lands in Newbury for a sum of ten pounds.

In 1791, 3,000 head of cattle grazed town lands, or on the region's abundant salt marsh hay. Other trades included tanning and shipbuilding. Newbury originally included Newburyport, set off in 1764, and West Newbury, set off in 1819.

In 1636, the first water-powered mill was established at the falls. Gristmills and sawmills were built, and in 1794, the first textile mill in Massachusetts. At Byfield in 1763 was founded the nation's first boarding preparatory school, Dum'r (Dummer) Charity School, known subsequently as Dummer Academy, Governor Dummer Academy, and now The Governor's Academy. It was also site of the first female seminary, founded in 1807. Byfield developed into a mill village, and once had six water-powered mills, manufacturing various products from woolens to snuff.

The railroad entered the community in 1850, carrying freight but also tourists, helping Plum Island develop into a Victorian seaside resort. Back on the mainland, silver was discovered in a large field in 1878, and the Chipman Silver Mine would begin operations until it finally closed in 1925. By 1905, however, the economy had shifted back to agriculture, and Newbury became a supplier of eggs, milk and poultry. Some would dig for clams or hay the salt marshes. The town is today primarily residential, with many examples of fine antique architecture.

Geography
Newbury lies just south of the mouth of the Merrimack River, and is drained by the Little River and Parker River, which, along with the Plum Island River, drain into Plum Island Sound, separating Plum Island from the mainland. Much of the town land is made of marshes, and is protected land, included in the Parker River National Wildlife Refuge, Old Town Hill Reservation Area, Kents Island Wildlife Management Area, Downfall Wildlife Management Area and parts of the Mill River Wildlife Management Area and Crane Pond Wildlife Management Area.

Newbury is located along the Atlantic Ocean, and is bordered by Newburyport to the north, West Newbury to the northwest, a small portion of Groveland to the west, Georgetown to the southwest, and Rowley to the south.

Interstate 95 passes through the western part of town, with two exits providing access to the town. U.S. Route 1, locally known as the Newburyport Turnpike, passes from north to south through the middle of the town, and Massachusetts Route 1A's northernmost portion passes through the east of town, just inland from the marshes. The town is home to the Plum Island Airport, a private general aviation airport; the nearest national service is at Logan International Airport. The Newburyport/Rockport Line of the MBTA Commuter Rail passes through town, with its northern terminus just over the Newburyport line.

Demographics

As of the census of 2000, there were 6,717 people, 2,514 households, and 1,815 families residing in the town. The racial makeup of the town was 98.32% White, 0.37% African American, 0.13% Native American, 0.45% Asian, 0.01% Pacific Islander, 0.28% from other races, and 0.43% from two or more races. Hispanic or Latino of any race were 0.91% of the population.

There were 2,514 households, out of which 35.7% had children under the age of 18 living with them, 61.5% were married couples living together, 7.4% had a female householder with no husband present, and 27.8% were non-families. 22.6% of all households were made up of individuals, and 9.1% had someone living alone who was 65 years of age or older.  The average household size was 2.66 and the average family size was 3.16.

In the town, the population was spread out, with 27.1% under the age of 18, 4.3% from 18 to 24, 30.0% from 25 to 44, 27.9% from 45 to 64, and 10.7% who were 65 years of age or older.  The median age was 40 years. For every 100 females, there were 94.0 males.  For every 100 females age 18 and over, there were 91.7 males.

The median income for a household in the town was $74,836, and the median income for a family was $83,428. Males had a median income of $52,366 versus $35,656 for females. The per capita income for the town was $34,640.  About 1.2% of families and 3.1% of the population were below the poverty line, including 2.3% of those under age 18 and 9.2% of those age 65 or over.

Education

Newbury is home to one public elementary school which serves K–6: Newbury Elementary School. Middle School students attend Triton Regional Middle School for 7–8, and high school students attend Triton Regional High School for 9–12, along with Rowley, and Salisbury.

Points of interest

 Coffin House (1678)
 Dole-Little House
 James Noyes House
 Spencer-Peirce-Little Farm
 Swett-Ilsley House
 Abraham Adams House
 The Governor's Academy (formerly Governor Dummer Academy), a private preparatory school in Byfield

Notable people

 Joshua Coffin, American antiquary and abolitionist
 Andre Dubus III (born 1959), author and short story writer
 Richard Dummer, settled in Newbury in May 1635
 William Dummer, Lt. Governor of the Massachusetts Bay Colony
 Jonathan Singletary Dunham, prominent early American settler of Woodbridge Township, New Jersey
 Moses Little, colonel of the 12th Continental Regiment during the American Revolution
 William Henry Moody, United States Supreme Court Justice, United States Attorney General, assisted in the prosecution of Lizzie Borden
 Samuel Moore, settled in Newbury in 1634, and then emigrated to Woodbridge, New Jersey, where he held many offices in the fledgling colony
 Theophilus Parsons, Chief Justice of the Massachusetts Supreme Judicial Court
 Eliphalet Pearson, first Principal of Phillips Academy (1778–1786) and Acting President of Harvard University (1804–1806)
 John Woodbridge, settled in Newbury in 1634 and married Mercy Dudley, daughter of Governor Thomas Dudley. He served as Town Clerk of Newbury from 1634 to 1638 and as Deputy to the General Court, 1639-40-41. He was ordained over the church in Andover, 24 October 1645

See also
 Parker River National Wildlife Refuge

Sources

Bibliography

External links

 Town of Newbury official website
March, E. 1795 Map of Newbury. At the Essex County Registry of Deeds in Salem, Massachusetts.
Anderson, Philander. 1830 Map of Newbury.
Beers, D.G. 1872 Atlas of Essex County, Massachusetts Newbury. Plate 25.West Newbury. Plate 27.
Walker, George H. 1884 Atlas of Essex County, Massachusetts Newbury. Plate 139.
 Newbury Vital Records to 1849
 Library of Congress. Historic American Buildings Survey.
 Knight-Short House, 6 High Street, Newbury Old Town, MA
 Jackman-Willett House, Lower Green vicinity, Newbury Old Town, MA
 Dr. Peter Toppan House, Newbury Old Town, MA
 Milestones UU, VV, WW, XX, YY & ZZ, Various Newbury locations, Newbury Old Town, MA

 
Populated places established in 1635
Populated coastal places in Massachusetts
1635 establishments in Massachusetts